Just Kidding is a Canadian live-action hidden camera reality series that first aired on February 3, 2013 on its original channel, Teletoon, and November 19, 2012 on Disney XD. It is not broadcast on Télétoon due to TVA's broadcasting rights of the series in French-Canadian territories. However, on September 1, 2015, the series moved over to La Chaîne Disney. The series has also been broadcast in the UK (CBBC), France, Australia, Poland, Brazil, Spain, Norway, Turkey, and Sweden. Unlike the international versions, the Disney XD version is hosted by YouTube sensation Zach Fox, and the Disney XD stars Jason Earles and Tyrel Jackson Williams, and since 2014, is hosted by the Disney Channel star Calum Worthy. In 2014, Just Kidding (along with other live-action Teletoon shows, My Babysitter's a Vampire and R.L. Stine's The Haunting Hour) moved from Teletoon to YTV. The series was cancelled on November 30, 2014.

The show is loosely based on Just for Laughs: Gags (which is itself based on the American show Candid Camera),  with some inspiration from René Cardona's La risa en vacaciones series to boot, only this show's premise focuses on kids pulling jokes. The series plays with no written dialogue, apart from the main theme which gives the impression that all the kids share the hosting position.

Episodes

Series overview

Season 1 (2012–13)

Season 2 (2014–15)

References

External links
 Website
 Production website

Hidden camera television series
2012 Canadian television series debuts
2014 Canadian television series endings
Teletoon original programming
Disney XD original programming
2010s Canadian comedy television series